Kurac, Pička, Govno, Sisa (trans. Dick, Pussy, Shit, Tit) is the first live album by Rambo Amadeus, released in 1993. It was recorded on 29 September 1992 at a concert in Skopje, Macedonia. Among the well-known Rambo Amadeus' songs, the album contains a number of improvisations of the famous themes.

Title 
The title of the album and the first track came from the name of the secret organization KPGS, which Rambo Amadeus has founded in 1987 with Nebojša Dudek and Saša Marković Mikrob. Its name was an acronym of Kurac! Pička! Govno! Sisa! which was created spontaneously in the telephone conversation between Marković and Dudek.

Track listing 

 K.P.G.S. oda radosti
 Bojler protiv bojlera
 Karamba karambita
 Električno oro
 B-ton
 Hej živote varalico stara
 Mala, jebo te ja lično i personalno
 Priatelju (Mrš. u pizdu materinu)
 Mix No. 2745/12
 Kataklizma komunizma
 Opojne droge su opasne po mladi organizam
 Prdež u kadi, dim na vodi
 H.I.H.
 Kraj

References

External links 
Kurac, pička, govno, sisa, on Rambo Amadeus' official web site

Rambo Amadeus albums
1993 live albums